Yadavrao Tasgaonkar College of Engineering & Management (YTCEM), is a private engineering college located at Bhivpuri Road railway station, Karjat, in Raigad District in the Indian state of Maharashtra. The college is located on more than 125 acres in the foothills of Matheran, surrounded by the Sahyadri Mountains on the banks of the Ulhas River.

The college offers bachelor's and master's degree in the fields of Civil engineering, Computer engineering, Electronics & telecommunications engineering, IT engineering, Mechanical engineering.

History 
It was founded in 2008–09.

Accreditation 
YTCEM is part of the Saraswati Education Society. The institute is approved by the All India Council for Technical Education (AICTE) and by the government of Maharashtra. YTCEM is affiliated with the University of Mumbai.

References

External links
Official website
Institute website

Engineering colleges in Maharashtra
University of Mumbai
Educational institutions established in 2008
2008 establishments in Maharashtra